Tetracapsuloides bryosalmonae is a myxozoan parasite of salmonid fish. It is the only species currently recognized in the monotypic genus Tetracapsuloides. It is the cause of proliferative kidney disease (PKD), one of the most serious parasitic diseases of salmonid populations in Europe and North America that can result in losses of up to 90% in infected populations.

Taxonomy
Until the late 1990s, the organism which caused PKD was enigmatic, thus called PKX organism. The causative agent of PKD was recognized as a form of Malacosporean, but the absence of mature spores in salmonid hosts, the lack of fish to fish transmission, and seasonality of the disease suggested that the life cycle of PKX was completed in another host and that infection of salmonids could be accidental. Korotneff observed a myxozoan in the bryozoan, Plumatella fungosa, in 1892, which he described as Myxosporidium bryozoides. Myxozoan infection of bryozoans was not reported again until 1996. Ecological investigations of freshwater bryozoans in North America discovered parasitic sacs of a myxozoan species, freely floating in the body cavities of several bryozoans. Molecular analyses indicated that the 18S rDNA sequences of these sacs were indistinguishable from those of PKX. The PKX organism was scientifically described as Tetracapsuloides bryosalmonae Canning, Curry, Feist, Longshaw & Okamura 1999, which was assigned to a new class, the Malacosporea within the phylum Myxozoa. Around the same time, another group described the PKX organism from Arctic char, Salvelinus alpinus, as Tetracapsuloides renicola Kent, Khattra, Hedrick & Devlin 2000, but the first given name has priority according to the rules of the binomial nomenclature.

Life cycle
T. bryosalmonae has a two-host life cycle, as other myxosporeans, cycling between freshwater bryozoa and salmonid fish species, rather than an oligochaete or polychaete worm as for Myxobolus cerebralis. To date, T. bryosalmonae has been found to parasitize at last five freshwater bryozoans Phylactolaemata species belonging to the genera Fredericella and Plumatella, all considered to be primitive genera. Infected bryozoans release mature T. bryosalmonae malacospores during overt infections when large spore sacs are freely floating within their coelomic cavity. Bryozoan dispersal strategies, including colony fragmentation, statoblast dispersal and the formation of migrating zooids allow their colonization of new habitats and the spreading of infective T. bryosalmonae stages.

Pathology
Proliferative kidney disease (PKD) is characterized by a swollen kidney and spleen, bloody ascites, and pale gills, indicating the fish becomes anemic at the late stage of the disease. Note that those symptoms are common amongst many other fish diseases and do not specifically indicate an infection with Tetracapsuloides bryosalmonae. It is important to clarify the pathologic condition only happens in species particularly susceptible, or naïve, to T. bryosalmonae. In those cases, the parasite is allowed to cross the renal tubules wall to proliferate within the interstitial tissue of kidney (histozoic proliferation). This proliferation stage is a dead end for the parasite (extrasporogonic proliferation) but instead causes a tumultuous tumour-like tissue reaction in the kidney, inducing a chronic lymphoid hyperplasia marked by a strong parasite-driven immunosuppressant pathogenesis and a dysregulation of T-helper subsets.

Distribution
T. bryosalmonae has been recorded in Europe and North America. Phylogenetic analyses of internal transcribed spacer 1 sequences revealed a clade composed of all North American sequences plus a subset of Italian and French sequences. High genetic diversity in North America and the absence of genotypes which are characteristic of the North American clade in the rest of Europe implies that southern Europe was colonized by immigration from North America; however, sequence divergence suggests that this colonization substantially pre-dated human movements of fish. Furthermore, the lack of southern European lineages in the rest of Europe, despite widespread rainbow trout farming, indicates that T. bryosalmonae is not transported through fisheries activities. This result contrasts with the commonness of fisheries-related introductions of other pathogens and parasites such as Myxobolus cerebralis and Ceratomyxa shasta. PKD is a serious immunopathology causing a high mortality rate, thus with a relevant economic impact for trout aquaculture in Europe and North America.

Cited literature
 
 
 
 
 
 
 
 
 
 
 
 
 
 

Malacosporea
Animal parasites of fish
Kidney diseases
Veterinary parasitology
Monotypic cnidarian genera
Parasites of fish
Fish diseases